The Amqu (also Amka, Amki, Amq) is a region (now in eastern Lebanon), equivalent to the Beqaa Valley region, named in the 1350–1335 BC Amarna letters corpus.

In the Amarna letters, two other associated regions appear to be east(?) and north(?), and are often mentioned in association with Amqu, namely Nuhašše, and Niya-Niye (or Nii). A third hypothetical region, either adjacent or within the region of Amqu, is Subaru, as according to the letter corpus possessions or people were sold: "at the land of Subaru".

The affairs in the region are often associated with Hatti, or the King of Hatti-(to the north), or with Etakkama of Qidšu/Qinsa-(also Kissa)-(i.e. Kadesh).

Abdi-Riša letter-(his only letter)
(The scribe wrote four identical letters-(for four city-state leaders), so who the 'author' is has to be speculative.)

EA 363, title: "A joint report on Amqu (4)"
El Amarna letter 363, (EA for 'el Amarna'), "Report no 4" of 4.
"Say to the king-(i.e. Pharaoh), my lord, my god, my Sun: Message of 'Abdi-Riša, your servant, the ruler of E(ni)šasi. I fall in the dirt under the feet of the king, my lord, 7 times and 7 times. Look, we ar(e) in Amqu, in cities of the king, my lord, and Etakkama, the ruler of Qinsa-(Kadesh), assisted the troops of Hatti and set the cities of the king, my lord, on fire. May the king, my lord, take cognizance, and may the king, my lord, give archers that we may (re)gain the cities of the king, my lord, and dwell in the cities of the king, my lord, my god, my Sun."  -EA 363, lines 1-23 (complete)

See also
Abdi-Riša
Amarna letters
Aammiq Wetland

References
Moran, William L. The Amarna Letters. Johns Hopkins University Press, 1987, 1992. (softcover)

Amarna letters locations
Geography of Phoenicia

External links
IV: International Affairs: (Amarna Period).
Hittites: Empires strike back